The  Irani River (Portuguese, Rio Irani) is a river of Santa Catarina state in southeastern Brazil. It is a tributary of the Uruguay River.

See also
 List of rivers of Santa Catarina
 Tributaries of the Río de la Plata

References

 Map from Ministry of Transport

Rivers of Santa Catarina (state)
Tributaries of the Uruguay River